Gustavo Adolfo Benjumea Jaramillo (born 12 January 1996) is a Colombian footballer who currently plays as a defender for Orsomarso.

Career statistics

Club

Notes

References

1996 births
Living people
Footballers from Cali
Colombian footballers
Association football defenders
Categoría Primera A players
Categoría Primera B players
Campeonato de Portugal (league) players
Deportes Quindío footballers
Atlético Huila footballers
América Futebol Clube (MG) players
Deportivo Pasto footballers
Águilas Doradas Rionegro players
Boyacá Chicó F.C. footballers
S.U. 1º Dezembro players
Clube Olímpico do Montijo players
Tigres F.C. footballers
Orsomarso S.C. footballers
Colombian expatriate footballers
Colombian expatriate sportspeople in Brazil
Expatriate footballers in Brazil
Colombian expatriate sportspeople in Portugal
Expatriate footballers in Portugal